Veetla Visheshanga is a 1994 Indian Tamil-language comedy drama film, written and directed by K. Bhagyaraj. The film stars Bhagyaraj himself and Pragathi, with Janagaraj, Suresh and Tanikella Bharani in supporting roles. It was released on 14 January 1994, Pongal day. The film was remade in Hindi as Mr. Bechara (1996) and in Kannada as Banallu Neene Buviyallu Neene (2002).

Plot 
Gopal, a widower and father of a child, admits a woman in the hospital who had lost her memory. Since he admitted her in the hospital, the doctor asks him to take care of her until she recovers from amnesia. The doctor names her Gowri, which is the name of Gopal's wife and makes her believe that she is married to Gopal and has a child. Due to the circumstances, Gopal has to accept the situation and takes her to his house. Gowri insists that she does not remember any incident about her life with Gopal. To make her believe, the doctor lies to her that she has a birth mark in the part of the body only known to her husband. He also places a photograph of her with the wedding photo of Gopal. Gowri yet insists that she cannot remember anything, but believes that Gopal is her husband and she is mother of his child.

She starts to live with Gopal as his wife, which troubles him a lot as he knows that she is not his wife. She also showers affection on the child and gets attached to it. But she discovers that whatever is told to her is not true and she is neither married to Gopal nor a mother of a child. Gopal tells her to leave the house, but she says she cannot leave him or his child and wants to be with them forever. Gopal is convinced by everybody and finally agrees to marry her. But Gowri has an unknown fear that something might stop their marriage. On the day of marriage, Gowri sees someone as groom which confuses everyone. The groom sings a song which restores Gowri's memory. She is actually not Gowri, but Ganga  and her lover is the groom named Ganesh. When both were about to marry, they were stopped by some goons, because of which Ganga fell from the mountain, but survived with injuries. Gopal, who found the truth brought Ganesh to unite them. Gopal insists Ganga to marry Ganesh as both of them are lovers, to which Ganga unwillingly accepts. But while Ganesh tries to tie the Mangal Sutra, Ganga stops him and goes to Gopal saying that he may not need her, but she needs him and the child. Ganesh finds that motherly affection has won his love and leaves Ganga to Gopal. Gopal and Ganga  finally marry.

Cast 
 K. Bhagyaraj as Gopal
 Pragathi as Gowri and Ganga
 Mohana as Gopal's first wife
 Suresh as Ganesh
 Janagaraj as Doctor Shree
 Pazhanisamy as Doctor Murthi
 Tanikella Bharani as Inspector
 Junior Balaiah
 Viji
 david as kabali

Production 
Veetla Visheshanga was the title K. Bhagyaraj had chosen for a film; after that project was dropped, he reused the title for a new, unrelated film. It is the debut film of Pragathi.

Soundtrack 
The soundtrack was composed by Ilaiyaraaja and lyrics were written by Vaali and Pulamaipithan.

Telugu version
This film was dubbed into Telugu as Gowramma Nee Mogudevaramma. All lyrics were written by Rajasri.

Release and reception 
Veetla Visheshanga was released on 14 January 1994, Pongal day. Malini Mannath of The Indian Express wrote "The director seems to not confident about this script and confused about handling certain scenes. Bhagyaraj is capable of better stuff!" K. Vijiyan of New Straits Times wrote, "This movie is not Bhagiaraj at his best or his funniest". R. P. R. of Kalki felt the film lacked the magic of previous films of Bhagyaraj.

Remakes 
Veetla Visheshanga was remade in Hindi as Mr. Bechara (1996), and in Kannada as Banallu Neene Buviyallu Neene (2002).

References

External links 
 

1990s Tamil-language films
1994 comedy-drama films
1994 films
Films directed by K. Bhagyaraj
Films scored by Ilaiyaraaja
Indian comedy-drama films
Tamil films remade in other languages